Frederik's Church, popularly known as The Marble Church for its rococo architecture, is an Evangelical Lutheran church in Copenhagen, Denmark. The church forms the focal point of the Frederiksstaden district; it is located due west of Amalienborg Palace.

History and description
The church was designed by the architect Nicolai Eigtved in 1740 and was along with the rest of Frederiksstaden, a district of Copenhagen, intended to commemorate the 300 years jubilee of the first coronation of a member of the House of Oldenburg.

Frederick's Church has the largest church dome in Scandinavia with a span of 31m. The dome rests on 12 columns. The inspiration was probably St. Peter's Basilica in Rome.

The foundation stone was set by king Frederick V on October 31, 1749, but the construction was slowed by budget cuts and the death of Eigtved in 1754. In 1770, the original plans for the church were abandoned by Johann Friedrich Struensee. The church was left incomplete and, in spite of several initiatives to complete it, stood as a ruin for nearly 150 years.

In 1874, Andreas Frederik Krieger, Denmark's Finance Minister at the time, sold the ruins of the uncompleted church and the church square to Carl Frederik Tietgen for 100,000 Rigsdaler — none of which was to be paid in cash — on the condition that Tietgen would build a church in a style similar to the original plans and donate it to the state when complete, while in turn he acquired the rights to subdivide neighboring plots for development. 
   
The deal was at the time highly controversial. On 25 January 1877, a case was brought by the Folketing at the Court of Impeachment, Krieger being charged with corruption over this deal. He was, however, eventually acquitted.

Tietgen got Ferdinand Meldahl to design the church in its final form and financed its construction. Due to financial restrictions, the original plans for the church to be built almost entirely from marble were discarded, and instead Meldahl opted for construction to be done with limestone. The church was finally opened to the public on August 19, 1894.

Inscribed in gold lettering on the entablature of the front portico are the words: HERRENS ORD BLIVER EVINDELIG (Danish: "the word of the Lord endureth for ever." – 1 Peter 1:25, KJV).

A series of statues of prominent theologians and ecclesiastical figures, including one of the eminent Danish philosopher Kierkegaard (who, incidentally, had become very critical of the established church by the end of his life), encircles the grounds of the building.

Architecture and notable features

References

External links

Official website

Lutheran churches in Copenhagen
19th-century Church of Denmark churches
Church buildings with domes
Rococo architecture in Denmark
18th-century Lutheran churches
Tourist attractions in Copenhagen
Zinc sculptures in Denmark
Churches in the Diocese of Copenhagen
18th-century churches in Denmark